The Gene Rush House is a historic house at 9515 Barrett Road near Roland, Arkansas.  It is a single story structure built out of wood, with a board-and-batten finish, resting on a concrete block foundation faced in fieldstone.  The house was built about 1964; its architect is unknown.  Gene Rush, for whom it was built, was an influential head of Arkansas' Game and Fishing Commission, whose signature achievement was the reintroduction of the black bear into the state.

The house was listed on the National Register of Historic Places in 2019.

See also
National Register of Historic Places listings in Pulaski County, Arkansas

References

Houses on the National Register of Historic Places in Arkansas
Houses completed in 1964
Houses in Pulaski County, Arkansas